Gaziantep bombing may refer to: 

2012 Gaziantep bombing
May 2016 Gaziantep bombing
August 2016 Gaziantep bombing